HMS E34 was a British E class submarine built by John Thornycroft, Woolston, Hampshire. She was launched on 27 January 1917 and commissioned in March 1917. E34 was mined near the Eijerlandse Gronden, the sands between the Frisian islands Texel and Vlieland on 20 July 1918. There were no survivors.

Design
[[File:Royal Navy submarine, HMS E34, leaving Harwich Harbor, England (21331933118).jpg|300px|right|thumb|E34 leaving Harwich Harbor, England]]
She was powered by two  Vickers eight-cylinder two-stroke diesel engines and two  electric motors. E34 was capable of operating submerged for five hours when travelling at .E34'' was armed with a 12-pounder  QF gun mounted forward of the conning tower. She had five 18 inch (450 mm) torpedo tubes, two in the bow, one either side amidships, and one in the stern; a total of 10 torpedoes were carried.

E-Class submarines had wireless systems with  power ratings; in some submarines, these were later upgraded to  systems by removing a midship torpedo tube. Their maximum design depth was  although in service some reached depths of below . Some submarines contained Fessenden oscillator systems.

Crew
Her complement was three officers and 28 men.

References

Bibliography
 

 

British E-class submarines of the Royal Navy
Ships built in Southampton
1917 ships
World War I submarines of the United Kingdom
World War I shipwrecks in the North Sea
Royal Navy ship names
Maritime incidents in 1918
Ships sunk by mines
Ships built by John I. Thornycroft & Company